The  is a dam on the Ōi River in Haibara District, Kawanehon, Shizuoka Prefecture on the island of Honshū, Japan. It has a hydroelectric power generating station owned by the Chubu Electric Power Company.

History
The potential of the Ōi River valley for hydroelectric power development was realized by the Meiji government at the start of the 20th century. The Ōi River was characterized by a high volume of flow and a fast current. Its mountainous upper reaches and tributaries were areas of steep valleys and abundant rainfall, and were sparsely populated.

The British interests were bought out by 1921. The Ōigawa Dam was the second dam to be constructed on the main stream of the Ōi River. Construction began in 1934 and was completed in 1936. The Oikawa Dam is now operated and maintained by the Chubu Electric Power Company.

Design
Construction of the Ōigawa Dam was facilitated by its location on the Ōigawa Railway Ikawa Line, which was built largely to more materials and works up the Ōi River valley for dam construction. The design is a solid-core concrete gravity dam. The associated Ōigawa Hydroelectric Power Plant produces 68,200 KW of power.

Surroundings
Public access to the dam and its lake are by Shizuoka Prefectural Road 60, with bus connections to Shizuoka Station or Shin-Shizuoka Station.

References
Japan Commission on Large Dams. Dams in Japan:Past, Present and Future. CRC Press (2009). 
Photo site

Gravity dams
Dams in Shizuoka Prefecture
Hydroelectric power stations in Japan
Dams completed in 1936